Denzel Livingston (born April 18, 1993) is an American professional basketball player who last played for BC Rustavi of the Georgian Superliga. He played college basketball for Incarnate Word before playing in the NBA G League and Israel.

High school career
Livingston played basketball at local Waltrip High School, leading them to three playoff appearances. He led the city of Houston and District 21-4A in scoring as a senior, earned first team All-District 21-4A honors and was the co-MVP.

College career
After graduating high school, Livingston joined Incarnate Word when the school was still part of NCAA Division II and the Lone Star Conference, helping the Cardinals to get more relevance, specially on his last two seasons, which were among the best in school history. As a junior, he averaged 20.3 points, 6.4 rebounds, 3.8 assists and 2.5 steals per game and he followed that with 21.5 points, 5.9 rebounds, 2.9 assists and 2.6 steals per game as a senior while finishing in the top 10 nationally in steals on both years and being in the top five in scoring as a senior.

In his junior year, Livingston earned second team all-Southland Conference and all-Southland Conference Defensive Team honors and as a senior he grabbed first team all-Southland Conference and first team NABC All-District 23 honors while being named to the Lou Henson Award Mid-Season Watch List.

Professional career
After going undrafted in the 2015 NBA draft, Livingston joined the Houston Rockets for the 2015 NBA Summer League. On September 3, 2015, he signed with the Rockets, only to be waived by the team on October 23 after appearing in four preseason games.

On November 2, he was acquired by the Rio Grande Valley Vipers of the NBA Development League as an affiliate player of the Rockets.

In August, 2016, Livingston signed with Hapoel Kfar Saba of the Israeli Liga Leumit. On October 10, he made his debut in a 92–86 win over Hapoel Haifa, recording 26 points, nine rebounds, one steal and one block in 39 minutes.

On June 28, 2017, Livingston signed a one-year deal with Ironi Nahariya of the Israeli Premier League. On November 6, 2017, Livingston recorded a double-double and season-high of 23 points and 13 rebounds, shooting 6-of-9 from the field, in a 73–92 blowout loss to Hapoel Gilboa Galil.

On August 1, 2018, Livingston signed with Ironi Kiryat Ata for the 2018–19 season. In 27 games played for Kiryat Ata, he averaged 14.4 points, 6.2 rebounds, 2.7 assists and 2.1 steals per game.

Personal life
Livingston is the son of Edward and Dorothy Livingston and is studying general business. He has three brothers; Jerel Wiley, Cory Hubert and Reggie Hubert.

References

External links
 Incarnate Word bio
 RealGM profile
 USBasket profile
 Sports-Reference profile

1993 births
Living people
American expatriate basketball people in Georgia (country)
American expatriate basketball people in Israel
Basketball players from Houston
Hapoel Kfar Saba B.C. players
Incarnate Word Cardinals men's basketball players
Ironi Kiryat Ata players
Ironi Nahariya players
Point guards
Rio Grande Valley Vipers players
Shooting guards
American men's basketball players